NHST may refer to:

 NHST Media Group
 Null hypothesis significance testing, also known as statistical hypothesis testing